Buffalo Public School No. 77 is a historic school building located in Buffalo, Erie County, New York. It was built in 1927, and is a three-story, rectangular, brick building with Classical Revival detailing. It has a courtyard plan with a double-height gymnasium at one end and a double-height auditorium at the other.  The building is an example of a typical standardized public school plan developed by Ernest Crimi. The school building has been redeveloped as senior housing and a neighborhood community center.

It was listed on the National Register of Historic Places in 2017.

References

External links
Buffalo Rising: School 77 Reuse Kicks Off Today

School buildings on the National Register of Historic Places in New York (state)
Neoclassical architecture in New York (state)
School buildings completed in 1927
Buildings and structures in Buffalo, New York
National Register of Historic Places in Buffalo, New York
1927 establishments in New York (state)